Sierra Grande is an extinct stratovolcano in northeastern New Mexico that rises 2,200 feet above the surrounding plain.  It is part of the inactive Raton-Clayton volcanic field.

Geography
On a clear day, Sierra Grande can be seen from as far away as Texline, Texas, as well as from the summits of the Culebra Range in southern Colorado and northern New Mexico.

U.S. Highway 64, U.S. Highway 87 and the Colorado and Southern Railway run along the north and east of the volcano. The town of Des Moines is just to the northeast.  To the northwest is Capulin Volcano National Monument featuring Capulin Volcano, an extinct cinder cone also in the Raton-Clayton volcanic field.

Numerous watercourses form on and around the flanks of the volcano, including Pinabete Creek (which feeds into the Dry Cimarron River to the northeast), North Branch Corrumpa Creek and South Branch Corrumpa Creek (which join and become Corrumpa Creek to the east at Weatherly Lake), Seneca Creek, and Carrizo Creek.

Geology
Sierra Grande is the largest volcano in the Raton-Clayton volcanic field. Its flows range in age from 3.8 to 2.6 million years. The volcano is largely composed of two-pyroxene andesite, a rock type found almost nowhere else in the Raton-Clayton volcanic field.

References

External links 

Volcanoes of New Mexico
Extinct volcanoes
Shield volcanoes of the United States
Landforms of Union County, New Mexico
Mountains of New Mexico
Mountains of Union County, New Mexico